Erna was an  coaster that was built in 1922 by Howaldtswerke, Kiel, Germany for German owners. She was seized by the Allies at Kristiansand, Norway in July 1946, passed to the  Ministry of Transport (MoT) and renamed Empire Confederation. In 1947, she was sold to Cyprus and renamed Troödos. In 1952, she was sold to Costa Rica and renamed Burica, then another sale in 1953 saw her renamed Dmitris. In 1955, she was sold to Panama and renamed Cedar. She served until 1958 when she was scrapped in Hong Kong.

Description
The ship was built in 1922 as yard number 660 by Howaldtswerke, Kiel.

She had a GRT of 865 and a NRT of 491.

The engine was built by Howaldtswerke.

History
Erna was built for H A Petersen, Flensburg. She was the last ship operated by that company. On 11 April 1930, Erna was sold to Ernst Russ, Hamburg. Her port of registry was Hamburg and she used the Code Letters LNRK. U-738 sank with the loss of 22 of her 46 crew. On 17 March 1945, Erna was damaged by fire in an air raid. In July 1946, she was seized by the Allies at Kristiansand, Norway. She was passed to the MoT and renamed Empire Conforth.

In 1947, Empire Conforth was sold to Cyprus Ship Management Co, Cyprus and was renamed Troödos. In 1952, she was sold to Compagnia Maritima Punta Burica SA, Costa Rica and renamed Burica. In 1953, she was sole to Compagnia Santa Angelica, Costa Rica and renamed Dmitris. In 1955, she was sold to Metropolitan Agencies Ltd, Panama and renamed Cedar. She served until 1958 when she was scrapped in Hong Kong.

References

1922 ships
Ships built in Kiel
Steamships of Germany
Merchant ships of Germany
World War II merchant ships of Germany
Empire ships
Steamships of the United Kingdom
Merchant ships of the United Kingdom
Steamships of Cyprus
Merchant ships of Cyprus
Steamships of Costa Rica
Merchant ships of Costa Rica
Steamships of Panama
Merchant ships of Panama